Chlorine nitrate, with chemical formula ClNO3 is an important atmospheric gas present in the stratosphere.  It is an important sink of chlorine that contributes to the depletion of ozone.

It explosively reacts with metals, metal chlorides, alcohols, ethers, and most organic materials. When it is heated to decomposition, it emits toxic fumes of Cl2 and NOx.

It can be produced by the reaction of dichlorine monoxide and dinitrogen pentoxide at 0 °C:
Cl2O + N2O5 → 2 ClONO2

or by the reaction:
ClF + HNO3 → HF + ClONO2

It can also react with alkenes:
(CH3)2C=CH2 + ClONO2 → O2NOC(CH3)2CH2Cl

Chlorine nitrate reacts with metal chlorides:
4 ClONO2 + TiCl4 → Ti(NO3)4 + 4 Cl2

References 

 

Inorganic chlorine compounds
Nitrates
Oxidizing agents
Chlorine(I) compounds